Richard William Rowntree (6 April 1884 in Leyburn, England - 16 June 1968 in Auckland) was a New Zealand cricketer who played 33 first-class matches, all but two of them for Auckland.

A wicket-keeper and tail-end right-handed batsman, he played for Yorkshire Second XI in 1905. After a serious illness he migrated to New Zealand. He played his first game for Auckland in the 1914–15 season and his last at the age of 47 in the 1931–32 season. His career in Auckland senior club cricket extended from 1907 to 1935, when he was awarded a benefit match at the end of his last season.

He appeared in both matches New Zealand played against the visiting Australian team in 1920–21. Earlier in the tour he had made his highest score of 48: batting at number 11 for Auckland he added 75 for the last wicket with Eddie McLeod after the Australians had taken the first nine Auckland wickets for 73. He was selected as the principal wicket-keeper in the New Zealand team to tour Australia in 1925-26 but was unable to go, and was replaced by Ken James.

See also
 List of Auckland representative cricketers

References

External links
 Richard Rowntree at Cricket Archive

1884 births
1968 deaths
New Zealand cricketers
Pre-1930 New Zealand representative cricketers
Auckland cricketers
British emigrants to New Zealand
Wicket-keepers